The case of the Returnees from Albania was a massive criminal trial in an Egyptian military court from February to April 1999. The trial is one of the principal sources of information about Sunni terrorist groups in the 1990s, especially al-Gama'a al-Islamiyya and its offshoot Egyptian Islamic Jihad.

The largest trial in Egypt since the 1981 trials surrounding the assassination of President Anwar Sadat, it was a landmark case in the topics of extraordinary rendition and the credibility of the testimony of terrorism detainees.

The local Egyptian press coined the phrase "Returnees from Albania" to describe the defendants, in reference to the American-backed extraordinary rendition which saw suspects kidnapped from foreign locations and secretly brought back to Egypt to face trial. In actuality, 43 men were brought from Albania, Kuwait, Saudi Arabia and Yemen, and an additional 64 were tried in absentia.

The prosecution leaned heavily on the testimony of defendant Ahmad Ibrahim al-Sayyid al-Naggar, who was the first arrested.

Documentation and terminology
The documents speak of "the Muslim group" or "the Muslim organization", meaning al-Gama'a al-Islamiyya as it was at that time. Most of al-Gama'a later renounced violence, but a violent residue called Islamic Jihad remained; that group was later known as Egyptian Islamic Jihad (EIJ) to distinguish it from Palestinian Islamic Jihad. The remnants of EIJ and at least one person in the violent fugitive component of Gama'a (namely Mohammad Hasan Khalil al-Hakim) have since merged with al-Qaeda.

Reportage of events in the early 1990s mentions one more group, or rather one more name for some of the same people: Vanguards of Conquest. That was the faction of EIJ that was led by al-Zawahiri after the capture and sentencing of 'Abbud al-Zumar, the first emir of EIJ.

The charges
Broadly, the aim of al-Gama'a al-Islamiyya was to bring about the destruction of the Egyptian government, followed by its replacement with a sharia-based Islamist regime. To get there, the plan was to kill and intimidate government members, destroy the Egyptian tourism industry, and create fear and distrust in the Egyptian population. In more detail, the trial addressed
several bombings of banks
the 1990 assassination of the chairman of the Egyptian parliament Dr. Rif'at al-Mahjub
the 1993 assassination attempt of Interior Minister Abdul Halim Moussa, which killed four others
the 1993 assassination attempt against Prime Minister Atef Sedki, in which a child was killed
the 1994 assassination of Major General Ra'uf Khayrat (assistant director of the SSIS) in Cairo
the 1995 assassination of Egyptian attaché Ahmed Alaa Nazmi in Switzerland
the 1995 assassination attempt against President Hosni Mubarak in Addis Ababa (26 June; EIJ claim responsibility)
the 1995 bombing of Egypt's embassy in Pakistan, killing 15 people; an intended simultaneous mass murder of tourists at Khan al-Khalili did not materialize.
the 1997 massacre of tourists at Luxor

The accused
Twenty were acquitted, nine sentenced to death (all in absentia), 11 to life imprisonment, and 67 were given sentences up to 25 years.

The trial concluded that the "constituent assembly" of al-Gama'a contained these fifteen names.

Arrested and charged
The returnees themselves were around 14 in number. About 12 were snatched in Albania, one in Sofia, and one in Baku. One other was killed during the Tirana roundup, which arrested four and occurred in July 1998. The returnees include:

Funding and travel
Ahmad al-Naggar's controversial confession says that the money involved was not great and that it basically "came from Usama bin Ladin". But how exactly the agents in Albania got hold of money is not so simple. It seems probable that one or more Sunni terrorist charities were involved; both al-Haramain Foundation and Global Relief Foundation had branches in Tirana, and a third charity front, Benevolence International Foundation, had an office in Baku. (Al-Naggar himself held a low-paid job in Tirana as a teacher of Arabic for the Revival of Islamic Heritage Society, but that group was not accused nor incriminated in any way in the Returnees affair. On the contrary, al-Naggar was expected to get a job in Albania and give 10% of his wages to the terrorist group of which he himself was a member.)

References

Further reading
Andrew Higgins and Christopher Cooper, "Cloak and Dagger: A CIA-Backed Team Used Brutal Means to Crack Terror Cell", Wall Street Journal, 20 November 2001

External links
Foreign Broadcast Information Service 1999 coverage by Asharq al-Awsat

Egyptian Islamic Jihad
Trials in Egypt
Legal history of Egypt